Richard Alexis (born May 6, 1981) is a former American football running back. He was signed by the Jacksonville Jaguars as an undrafted free agent in 2004. He played college football at Washington.

Alexis was also a member of the St. Louis Rams and New York Sentinels.

See also
 Washington Huskies football statistical leaders

References

External links
Washington Huskies bio

1981 births
Living people
Sportspeople from Boynton Beach, Florida
American football running backs
Washington Huskies football players
Jacksonville Jaguars players
St. Louis Rams players
New York Sentinels players